The Laurentian Voyageurs women's ice hockey program represents Laurentian University in the Ontario University Athletics women's ice hockey conference of U Sports. Also known as the Lady Vees, the current head coach is Stacey Colarossi.

History

705 Challenge Cup
First established as a challenge between the varsity soccer teams of two Northern Ontario universities (Laurentian vs. Nipissing), in which the winning team was awarded the Riley Gallo Cup, the rivalry expanded. Introducing the 705 Challenge Cup in 2016, the results of all regular season games between the Lakers and the Voyageurs varsity teams for men’s and women’s basketball, ice hockey and soccer, comprised the overall won-loss record in determining the annual Cup winner. The Lakers would win their first 705 Challenge Cup during the 2019-20 athletics season. Of note, the scores below reflect the women's ice hockey matchups since the 705 Challenge Cup was introduced.

Season-by-season Record

Season team scoring champion

International
Stacey Colarossi Head Coach : 2019 Winter Universiade
Morgan McCann, Forward
Taylor Weber, Forward : Ice hockey at the 2019 Winter Universiade

Awards and honours

OUA honours

OUA All-Stars

OUA All-Rookie

USports honours

USports All-Rookie

Voyageurs in professional hockey

References

U Sports women's ice hockey teams
Women's ice hockey teams in Canada
Ice hockey teams in Ontario
 
Women in Ontario